The 1972 New Zealand gallantry awards were announced via two Special Honours Lists dated 7 March and 27 July 1972, and recognised five New Zealand military personnel for gallant and distinguished service during operations in Vietnam.

Distinguished Flying Cross (DFC)
 Squadron Leader Robin John Klitscher  – Royal New Zealand Air Force.
 Lieutenant Edwin Grant Steel – Royal New Zealand Infantry Regiment.

Military Medal (MM)
 Lance Corporal John Leonard Adams – Royal New Zealand Infantry Regiment.

Mention in despatches
 Lieutenant (temporary Captain) Robert John Sutherland Munro – Royal New Zealand Corps of Signals.
 Private Taare Parekura – Royal New Zealand Infantry Regiment.

References

Gallantry awards
New Zealand gallantry awards